Horseys Pond is a freshwater reservoir in Laurel, Delaware. It is located to the south of Laurel, with Little Creek linking the pond to the Broad Creek Hundred.

References 

Bodies of water in Sussex County, Delaware
Ponds of Delaware
Laurel, Delaware